Sujata Koirala born 9 February 1954) is a Nepalese politician and the only daughter of former Prime Minister Girija Prasad Koirala. She was made Foreign Minister under Prime Minister Madhav Kumar Nepal. Sujata was promoted to Deputy Prime Minister on October 12, 2009. She has a daughter named Melanie Koirala Jost.

Career
Koirala is the Immediate Chief of the International Relations Department of Nepali Congress and a member of the Central Working Committee. She is the former Deputy Prime Minister and Minister for Foreign Affairs of Nepal. She is the second women to become deputy prime minister in Nepal. The first, Shailaja Acharya, was Koirala's niece.

International Affiliations

Koirala is an active member of several international committees including the following:

 Head of International Relations Department, Nepali Congress Party
 Central Committee Member, Nepali Congress Party
 Member, Parliamentary Board, Nepali Congress Party
 Standing Committee Member, ICAPP (International Conference of Asian Political Parties)
 Member, Governing Council, CAPDI (Centrist Asia Pacific Democratic International)
 Vice-Chairperson, ICAPP Women's Wing
 Chairperson, the Global Parties Climate and Ecological Alliance (GPCEA) Women's Wing
 Member, International Advisory Board, China Center for Overseas Investment, Beijing, China 
 Member, International Advisory Council, Economic Club of China, Beijing, China
 Honorary Chairperson, Institute of Himalayan Studies, Chonqing, China

References

1954 births
Living people
Foreign Ministers of Nepal
Women government ministers of Nepal
Nepali Congress politicians from Koshi Province
Female foreign ministers
S
Nepalese women diplomats
Nepal MPs 2017–2022
Deputy Prime Ministers of Nepal
People from Biratnagar
21st-century Nepalese women politicians
21st-century Nepalese politicians
Children of prime ministers of Nepal
Members of the 2nd Nepalese Constituent Assembly